"By the Time I Get to Phoenix" is a song written by Jimmy Webb. Originally recorded by Johnny Rivers in 1965, it was covered by American country music singer Glen Campbell on his album of the same name. Released on Capitol Records in 1967, Campbell's version topped RPM Canada Country Tracks, reached number two on Billboard Hot Country Singles chart, and won two awards at the 10th Annual Grammys. Broadcast Music, Inc. (BMI) named it the third most performed song from 1940 to 1990. The song was ranked number 20 on BMI's Top 100 Songs of the Century. Frank Sinatra called it "the greatest torch song ever written." It was No. 450 on Rolling Stone magazine's Top 500 Songs of All Time.

Background and writing
The inspiration for "By the Time I Get to Phoenix" originated in Jimmy Webb's breakup with Susan Horton. They remained friends after her marriage to Bobby Ronstadt, a cousin of singer Linda Ronstadt. Their relationship, which peaked in mid-1965, was also the primary influence for "MacArthur Park", another Webb composition.

Webb did not intend the song to be geographically literal. "A guy approached me one night after a concert [...] and he showed me how it was impossible for me to drive from L.A. to Phoenix, and then how far it was to Albuquerque. In short, he told me, 'This song is impossible.' And so it is. It's a kind of fantasy about something I wish I would have done, and it sort of takes place in a twilight zone of reality."

Webb called the song a "succinct tale" with an "O. Henry-esque twist at the end, which consists merely of the guy saying, 'She didn't really think that I would go,' but he did." Although the protagonist in the song plans to leave his lover, Webb did not leave Horton.

Covers
In 1990, Broadcast Music, Inc. (BMI), which monitors songs in its role as a performance rights organisation, listed "By the Time I Get to Phoenix" as the third-most performed song from the period between 1970 and 1990, and in 1999 listed it as the 20th most performed of the 20th century. Many cover versions have been recorded.  Charted versions include:

Isaac Hayes' version of the song, included on the album Hot Buttered Soul, runs for 18 minutes and 40 seconds, and recounts the events that transpired before the actual roadtrip.  The track was edited down to under seven minutes for single release, hitting #37 on both the US pop and R&B charts in 1969, and #48 in Canada.
The Mad Lads also covered the song in 1969 for Stax Records; their version reached #28 on the R&B singles chart and #56 in Canada.
Anne Murray and Glen Campbell recorded a medley of "I Say a Little Prayer" and "By the Time I Get to Phoenix" in 1971.  The track hit #1 on the Canadian country charts, and also charted on the US country charts and the US and Canadian pop charts (#19).
Isaac Hayes and Dionne Warwick released the song as a live medley with "I Say a Little Prayer" in 1977. The single reached #65 on the R&B singles chart.

Chart performance

References

External links
 Entry at discogs.com

1967 singles
1977 singles
Songs written by Jimmy Webb
Johnny Rivers songs
Glen Campbell songs
Gary Puckett & The Union Gap songs
Dean Martin songs
Wanda Jackson songs
Georgie Fame songs
Isaac Hayes songs
Dionne Warwick songs
Burl Ives songs
Anne Murray songs
Andy Kim songs
Andy Williams songs
Grammy Award for Best Male Pop Vocal Performance
Capitol Records singles
American songs
1965 songs
Torch songs